Sideroxylon hirtiantherum is a species of plant in the family Sapotaceae. It is endemic to Guatemala.

References

hirtiantherum
Vulnerable plants
Endemic flora of Guatemala
Taxonomy articles created by Polbot